Nabarbi was a Hurrian goddess worshiped in the proximity of the river Khabur, especially in the city Taite. It has been proposed that she was associated with the Syrian goddess Belet Nagar.

Name
Attested spellings of the name include dNa-bar-bi, dNa-a-bar-bi, dNa-a-bar-wi, dNa-wa-ar-we and dNa-bar-WA. The name is formed he same way as that of Kumarbi. The structure of these two names has been used as an argument in favor of restoring the name Ḫrḫb from the Ugaritic myth Marriage of Nikkal and Yarikh, written in the local alphabetic script, as Ḫiriḫibi, "he of the mountain Ḫiriḫ(i)," as both this god, and the myth itself are assumed to have Hurrian origin. On the same basis it has been argued that the god Aštabi had Hurrian origin. However, subsequent research has shown that the original spelling of the name was Aštabil, and that the god was already worshiped in Ebla before the arrival of Hurrians in Syria. Today it is instead assumed that he originated in a religious and linguistic substrate absorbed first by the Eblaites and then by Hurrians, similar to Ishara.

Alfonso Archi interprets the name Nabarbi as "she of Nawar," further derived from Hurrian naw, "pasture." Volkert Haas translates it as "she of the pasture."

In early scholarship the view that Nabar might be an uncommon spelling for Nippur was also present, leading to the proposal that Nabarbi was connected to Ninnibru, "Lady of Nippur," a name used to refer to the wife of Ninurta in the Ur III and Isin-Larsa periods.

Character
Alfonso Archi considers her to be one of the "principal deities" of the Hurrian pantheon. She was associated with ritual purification, and based on the etymology of her name possibly with pastures.

Alfonso Archi assumes that Nawar from Nabarbi's name had to be a different place from Nagar (Tell Brak), but that it is nonetheless possible she was identified with the tutelary goddess of that city, Belet Nagar, and with Ḫabūrītum, goddess of the river Khabur known from Mesopotamian sources from the Ur III period.  Piotr Taracha assumes that Nabarbi is one and the same as Belet Nagar, and as a result counts her among deities who were received by Hurrians from preexisting Syrian pantheons, unlike other researchers, who ascribe Hurrian origin to her. Belet Nagar appears already alongside Hurrian deities in the inscriptions of Hurrian king Tish-atal of Urkesh.

Worship
Based on placement in various documents, it is assumed Nabarbi was chiefly worshiped in the proximity of the river Khabur. One city where she was worshiped was Taite. She appears among Hurrian deities in the Shattiwaza treaty, near Teshub of Washukanni and Samanuha of Shadikanni.

It has been proposed by Volkert Haas that she also appears in documents from Emar. This interpretation has been accepted by Gary Beckman. However, despite being an object of worship, Nabarbi had no temple in that city.

Nabarbi continued to be worshiped in Taite in the Neo-Assyrian period. In the Takultu ritual, she appears alongside Kumarbi and Samanuha.

Associations with other deities
In the kaluti (offering lists) of the circle of Hebat Nabarbi occurs after Shaushka's handmaidens Ninatta and Kulitta, and before Shuwala and the dyad Urshui-Ishkalli.

Tashmishu was regarded as the husband of Nabarbi, as was Shuwaliyat, his Hittite counterpart. Volkert Haas argues that the pairing of Nabarbi and Shuwaliyat was based on their shared connection with vegetation: following his proposal regarding the origin of the name, she was a goddess of pastures, while it is agreed that Shuwaliyat was a vegetation deity. However, Tashmishu had no connection to vegetation.

Nabarbi was also  associated with Shuwala, the tutelary goddess of Mardaman. It has been proposed that the connection between them, which is particularly common in known sources, relied on the accidental similarity between the names of Shuwala and Shuwaliyat. However, it is also possible that it indicates both of these goddesses originated in the proximity of the Habur river. Worship of pairs of goddesses (for example Ishara and Allani, Hutena and Hutellura, Ninatta and Kulitta) as dyads was a common feature of Hurrian religion.

An association between Nabarbi and Shaushka is also attested. In some itkalzi ("purification") rituals they appear alongside the pairs Hutena and Hutellura, Ea and Damkina, and Hebat and Mušuni. One of such texts refers to "water of Shaushka and Nabarbi," believed to have purifying qualities.

References

Bibliography

Hurrian deities